Raymond Daniel Saleaumua (born November 25, 1964) is a Samoan American former American football player in the National Football League (NFL). He played professionally for the Detroit Lions, the Kansas City Chiefs and the Seattle Seahawks.

Early life
Saleaumua was born in San Diego, California. He attended high school at Sweetwater High and attended college at Arizona State. He played Nose tackle, defensive tackle, and defensive end throughout his college and pro career.

Professional career
Saleaumua played in the NFL for twelve seasons. He was drafted by the Detroit Lions in the 7th round (175th overall) of the 1987 NFL Draft. He played for the Detroit Lions for two years, 1987 and 1988.

He then played for the Kansas City Chiefs from 1989 to 1996, and finally the Seattle Seahawks in 1997 and 1998. He played in the Pro Bowl in 1995. His fumble recovery record for the Kansas City Chiefs (17) still stands. He graduated from Arizona State in 1997.

Life after the NFL
Saleaumua was the volunteer defensive line coach in 2000 and 2001 for Desert Vista High School in Phoenix, Arizona. In January 2011, he led his team to a commanding 21-8 victory as head coach in the Polynesian All American Classic Bowl game in Los Angeles.

Saleaumua lives in Phoenix, Arizona and Kansas City, Missouri. He has been an entrepreneur and business owner since his NFL career.  He is the father of two grown sons.

In January 2019 Dan Saleaumua was inducted into the Polynesian Football Hall of Fame.

Personal life
Saleaumua's sister is married to his former Chiefs teammate, Tim Grunhard.

Career statistics

Punts and kickoffs:

References

External links
 
 Dan Saleaumua’s Take a Swing at Cancer
 Pro-Football-Reference.com: Dan Saleaumua
 NFL.com profile: Dan Saleaumua

1964 births
Living people
American football defensive tackles
American Conference Pro Bowl players
Detroit Lions players
Kansas City Chiefs players
Seattle Seahawks players
Arizona State Sun Devils football players
People from National City, California
American sportspeople of Samoan descent
Players of American football from San Diego